Bermuda competed at the 1952 Summer Olympics in Helsinki, Finland.

Athletics

Women
Track & road events

Field events

Diving

Men

Swimming

Men

References
Official Olympic Reports

Nations at the 1952 Summer Olympics
1952 Summer Olympics
1952 in Bermudian sport